Casey Viator/Casius Viatoro (September 4, 1951 – September 4, 2013) was an American professional bodybuilder. He is noted as the youngest ever AAU Mr. America – gaining the title at the age of 19 in 1971.

Viator grew up in New Iberia, Louisiana and began training with Kenwood Broussard. In 1968, Viator placed third in the Mr. Louisiana contest.  The following year, he came in sixth in the 1969 Teen Mr. America, but won in the categories Best arms, Best Abs, Best Chest, Best Legs and Most Muscular. In 1970, Casey Viator's upper arm measured at 19 5/16 inches, and his forearm at 15 7/16 inches.

He trained under the guidance of Arthur Jones for ten months prior to the Mr. America contest at DeLand High School in DeLand, Florida.  The two first met briefly at the 1970 Mr. America contest in Los Angeles, California, where Viator placed third.  Realizing Viator's potential, Jones offered Viator a job at his business Arthur Jones Productions later known as Nautilus Sports Medicine. 

Viator won three separate bodybuilding championships; Teen Age Mr. America, Jr. Mister America, and lastly, the title of Mr. America.  In 1982 he capped off his bodybuilding career by placing third in the Mr. Olympia competition.

Viator was a writer for Muscle & Fitness and Flex magazines.

Viator died on September 4, 2013 due to a massive heart attack on his 62nd birthday.

Titles won 
 1970 AAU Teen Mr. America
 1970 AAU Teen Mr. America (Most Muscular)
 1970 AAU Mr. USA
 1971 AAU Mr. USA
 1971 AAU Jr. Mr. America
 1971 AAU Mr. America
 1980 IFFB Louisiana Grand Prix
 1980 IFFB Pennsylvania Gran Prix
 1980 Pittsburgh Pro Invitational

See also 
 Colorado Experiment, in which he gained 63 pounds of muscle in four weeks
 List of male professional bodybuilders
 List of female professional bodybuilders

References 

 Roark, Joe.  Factoids: featuring 2004 hall of fame inductee Casey Viator.  Flex Magazine, May 2004.

External links 
 

 An Interview with Bodybuilding Legend Casey Viator by David Robinson
 History of Mr. Olympia: Casey Viator
 The Colorado Experiment, during which Casey Viator reportedly gained 63 pounds of muscle in only twenty eight days using Nautilus equipment
 Casey Viator Bodybuilding Gallery
 The Nautilus Bulletins describing Casey's HIT training

1951 births
2013 deaths
American bodybuilders
American male journalists
People associated with physical culture
Professional bodybuilders
Sportspeople from Lafayette, Louisiana
Writers from Lafayette, Louisiana